Constantine is the solo debut album of rock singer Constantine Maroulis. It debuted at number 75 on the Billboard 200, selling around 9,000 copies in its first week.

Track listing 
"Girl Like You"  
"Several Thousand"
"Everybody Loves"
"Child, You're the Revolution"
"Right To My Head"
"Favorite T-Shirt"
"Sister, Sister"
"Fading Into You"
"I Thought It Was Something"
"So Long"
"Heaven Help The Lonely"
"Midnight Radio"

Billboard Chart sales

References

2007 debut albums
Constantine Maroulis albums